Arteh Bolagh (also Romanized as Ārteh Bolāgh and Ārtah Bolāgh; also known as Ūrteh Bolāgh) is a village in Haram Rud-e Sofla Rural District, Samen District, Malayer County, Hamadan Province, Iran. At the 2006 census, its population was 22, in 5 families.

References 

Populated places in Malayer County